Nieuwezijds Kapel (Dutch - New Side's Chapel), or Heilige Stede (Dutch - holy site) or Chapel of the Heilige Stede refers to a site in Amsterdam that includes shops and a Dutch Reformed church built in 1908 on the site of a church once called the Heilige Stede, originally built in the 15th century to replace a chapel that burned in a city fire of 1452. That original chapel had been built in 1347 as a result of the miracle of Amsterdam (15 March 1345), located on the Kalverstraat where this miracle with the eucharistic host occurred.

History

In the beeldenstorm of 1566 the chapel was severely damaged, and after the Alteratie, the chapel came into Protestant hands, when it was renamed the Nieuwezijds Chapel by them.  The yearly procession that until then had taken place by the Catholics, was forbidden. In 1881, this tradition was reinstated as the Stille Omgang.

The building was deconstructed in 1908, after the Protestant church fathers decided to consolidate the space and sell off the surrounding land to generate income. At that period the Catholic Church was enjoying a surge in popularity and the Protestants were determined not to "give them back their church grounds". The various sections of the old church outside the part left for the modern chapel, were stripped of useful materials, to prevent them ever being used again for Catholic worship, and the ground was sold for the construction of shops, so that the Catholics could never have it back.  The miracle church's function had already long been taken over by the Roman Catholic schuilkerk at the Amsterdam Beguinage. Despite these measures, the site still has many parts of the old church intact, and the cultural history of the entire site is important for the city of Amsterdam.

Parts of the chapel are still to be found in the Enge Kapelsteeg and on the roof of the schuilkerk De Papegaai in the Kalverstraat.  A few fragments of the chapel came to be on the Frankendael in the Watergraafsmeer.  On the Rokin was erected the Mirakelkolom (miracle column), though this was disassembled and raised for the construction of the North-south line of the Amsterdam Metro. The entire site is considered a Rijksmonument, except for certain parts of the interior such as the modern organ.

References

External links
  Website on the het Gezelschap of the Stille Omgang
  The Miracle of Amsterdam on amsterdam.nl
  Nieuwezijds Kapel (Heilige Stede), (1347, 1908/12) on bma.amsterdam.nl
  Amsterdam, Holy Sacrament ('Sacrament of the Miracle')

Buildings and structures completed in 1347
Churches completed in 1908
Churches in Amsterdam
Chapels in the Netherlands
Rijksmonuments in Amsterdam
20th-century religious buildings and structures in the Netherlands